Leonard Sumner is an Anishinaabe singer-songwriter from Canada, whose music blends aspects of country, folk and hip-hop music.

Music career 
He is most noted for his 2018 album Standing in the Light, which received a Juno Award nomination for Indigenous Music Album of the Year at the Juno Awards of 2019.

He released his debut album Rez Poetry in 2013, and followed up with Standing in the Light in 2018.

Awards and nominations

Personal life 
A member of the Little Saskatchewan First Nation in Manitoba, Sumner has been based in Winnipeg since 2011. He is married to writer Tasha Spillett-Sumner. She gave birth to their daughter, Isabella, in March 2020.

References

External links

Canadian male singer-songwriters
Canadian folk singer-songwriters
Canadian country singer-songwriters
Ojibwe people
First Nations musicians
Musicians from Manitoba
Living people
21st-century Canadian male singers
Year of birth missing (living people)